Ramnivas Golada (born 23 October 1994) is an Indian cricketer. He made his Twenty20 debut for Rajasthan in the 2018–19 Syed Mushtaq Ali Trophy on 2 March 2019. He made his first-class debut on 12 February 2020, for Rajasthan in the 2019–20 Ranji Trophy.

References

External links
 

1994 births
Living people
Indian cricketers
Rajasthan cricketers
Place of birth missing (living people)